Mirko Basaldella (28 September 1910 – 24 November 1969) was an Italian sculptor and painter.

Early life and education
Mirko was born in Udine, Italy on September 28, 1910, the second of three brothers (Dino was the eldest, and Afro the youngest). He grew up in a family of artists: his father Leo (1886 – 1918) was a painter and decorator, and since youth Mirko and his brothers showed a precocious artistic talent. Mirko studied at the Accademia di Belle Arti di Venezia and at the Accademia di Belle Arti di Firenze; in 1928 he first exhibited his work in Udine, alongside the paintings of his two brothers. Dino, Mirko and Afro later attended the Institute of Applied Arts in Monza, where they studied under the sculptor Arturo Martini.

Career

In 1934 Mirko moved to Rome, where he held his first solo exhibition in 1936 at the Galleria della Cometa. In the same year he exhibited his work at the Venice Biennale, together with other artists associated with the so-called Scuola Romana (including Giuseppe Capogrossi, Alberto Ziveri, Guglielmo Janni and Renato Guttuso).

In 1955 Mirko won the first prize for sculpture at the São Paulo Art Biennial. In 1957 he moved to Cambridge, Massachusetts where Josep Lluís Sert appointed him to direct the Design Workshop at Harvard University; Mirko stayed there until 1963, when he joined Eduard Sekler and Robert Gardner in the newly-created Department of Visual and Environmental Studies. In 1962 he was elected a member of the American Academy of Arts and Sciences.

Death and legacy
He died in Cambridge on November 24, 1969.

References

1910 births
1969 deaths
20th-century Italian painters
20th-century Italian male artists
Italian male painters
People from Udine
Italian contemporary artists
Italian sculptors